Lukavice is a municipality and village in Šumperk District in the Olomouc Region of the Czech Republic. It has about 900 inhabitants.

Administrative parts
Villages of Slavoňov and Vlachov are administrative parts of Lukavice.

References

Villages in Šumperk District